Peterson House, also known as Ticen (Tyson) House, in Lakewood, Colorado, USA, was built c. 1885. It was listed on the National Register of Historic Places in 1981.

It was deemed to be historically important as the only surviving early frame structure in the Bear Creek area, and also as the only surviving early structure of the historic Cowan neighborhood of Morrison, Colorado.  It has a simplified Victorian vernacular architecture.

The historic Pioneer Union Ditch runs through the site.

References

Houses on the National Register of Historic Places in Colorado
Houses completed in 1885
Houses in Jefferson County, Colorado
National Register of Historic Places in Jefferson County, Colorado
Relocated buildings and structures in Colorado